Les Monstres sacrés is a three-act play written by French dramatist Jean Cocteau, premiered on 17 February 1940 at the Michel Theater in Paris.

Original cast 
 Yvonne de Bray  Esther
 Jany Holt  Liane
 Suzanne Dantès Charlotte
 Claire Gérard  Loulou
 Morgane The old lady
 André Brulé  Florent
 Jean Hubert The Speaker

Plays by Jean Cocteau